The High Commissioner of the United Kingdom to the Republic of Singapore is the United Kingdom's foremost diplomatic representative in Singapore.

Singapore, previously a British colony, became an internally self-governing state in 1959 and George Douglas-Hamilton, 10th Earl of Selkirk, was appointed Commissioner (not High Commissioner) for Singapore and South East Asia. In 1963 Singapore declared independence from Britain and joined the new Federation of Malaysia. In 1965 Singapore left Malaysia and became an independent country (as the Republic of Singapore) and a full member of the Commonwealth. As a member of the Commonwealth, the United Kingdom's diplomatic representative is a High Commissioner rather than an Ambassador.

The British High Commission is located at Tanglin Road, close to the Australian High Commission and American Embassy.

Commissioners
1959: Sir William Goode.  Colonial Secretary (1953–57), Last Governor of Singapore (1957–59) . He was appointed Commissioner as part of transitional arrangements.
1959–1963: Earl of Selkirk
1963–1965: Singapore united with Malaysia

High Commissioners
1965–1967: John Vernon Rob
1968–1970: Sir Arthur de la Mare
1970–1974: Sir Sam Falle
1974–1978: Peter Tripp
1978–1982: John Dunn Hennings
1982–1985: Sir Peter Moon
1985–1987: Sir Hamilton Whyte
1987–1990: Sir Michael Pike
1990–1997: Gordon Duggan
1997–2001: Alan Hunt
2001–2002: Sir Stephen Brown
2003–2007: Sir Alan Collins
2007–2011: Paul Madden
2011–2015: Antony Phillipson

2015–2019: Scott Wightman
2019–: Kara Owen

References

External links
UK and Singapore, gov.uk

 
Singapore
United Kingdom